Toola (Urdu: تولہ ) is a village in the administrative Tehsil Shakargarh, District Narowal Pakistan. The village is located between 2 tehsils of Narowal city Zafarwal and Shakargarh.

Demographics 
The area of the village is approximately 200 square kilometers. The village has a Primary School for Girls and Boys separately organized by the Government of the Punjab.

Health Unit 
The village Toola has the one basic Health unit run and organized by the Government of Punjab, Pakistan.

Education 
Village Toola has two elementary schools for boys and girls separately, Government Elementary School for Boys(I to VIII grade) and Government Elementary School for Girls(I to VIII grade) organized by the Government of the Punjab.

References 

Narowal District
Villages in Shakargarh Tehsil